Jainism in Bihar trace a long history since the times of twenty-fourth Tirthankara Mahavira, who was born in Vaishali (near Hajipur). The state of Bihar is considered to have played an important role in the development of Jainism.

History
Vasupujya, the 12th Jain Tirthankara was born in Champapur, Bhagalpur and attained all his Pancha Kalyanaka  in Champapuri.  Munisuvrata, the 20th Jain tirthankara was born in Rajgir. Vardhamana Mahavira, the 24th and the last Tirthankara of Jainism, was born in Vaishali around sixth century B.C. His father was a Nathvanshi Kshatriya chief of Kundalpur which has been identified with modern-day Nalanda district. Mahavir achieved nirvana in Pawapuri which is today a pilgrimage site for Jains from across the world.  An ancient black statue of Lord Mahavira weighing around 250 kg was recently stolen from Jamui, Bihar. The statue was later recovered by the Police.

Jain Pilgrimage
Pataliputra, Champapuri and Vaishali are significant religious places in Jainism. The tallest statue of Jain tirthankara Vasupujya which stands 31 feet in height was built in Champapuri in 2014. The Panch Kalyanak Pratishtha Mahotsav of the statue was done from 27 Feb to 3 Mar 2014. Kamaldah Jain Temple is the oldest Jain temple in Patna built in the 18th century. This temple, belonging to the digambar sect of Jainism, is dedicated to Neminatha, the 22nd tirthankara. This place has traditionally been associated with the birth of the renowned Jain teacher, Sthulabhadra.

Temples 
 Jal Mandir, Pawapuri
 Lachhuar Jain temple
 Champapur Jain Temple
 Arrah Jain temple

Siddha Kshetra 

 Siddha Kshetra Kamaldahji
 Siddha Kshetra Mandargiri
 Siddha Kshetra, Kundalpur
 Rajgir
 Siddha Kshsetra Gunawaji

Ancient Jain City 

 Rajgir
 Champapuri
 Vasupujya

Demography 
Jainism is an minority religion of Bihar, being practiced by 0.2% of the total state population. The Jain population in Bihar is 18,914 as of 2011 census report. As per 2001 census, Only 16,085 Jain were living in Bihar.

Notes

Religion in Bihar
Jainism in India